Korea Disease Control and Prevention Agency (KDCA), formerly Korea Centers for Disease Control and Prevention (KCDC), is an organization under the South Korean Ministry of Welfare and Health that is responsible for the advancement of public health by managing prevention, survey, quarantine, trial, and research on infectious diseases, chronic and rare illnesses and injuries. It was founded in December 2003 and is located in Osong Health Technology Administration Complex in Cheongju. The organization is led by the vice-ministerial-level Commissioner of KDCA.

History 
 July 14, 1949: Central Health Centre was created under Ministry of Health
 January 1, 1960: renamed to Central Health Institute
 August 12, 1960: renamed to National Institute of Health
 December 17, 1963: merged with National Chemical Laboratories, National Laboratory of Herb Medicine and National Institute of Public Health Training
 February 1, 1967: renamed to National Institute of Public Health Training
 November 1981: renamed to National Institute of Health
 December 23, 1994: re-organised under Ministry of Health and Welfare
 December 18, 2003: changed to Korea Centers for Disease Control and Prevention (KCDC)
 December 2010: moved its headquarters to Osong
 April 2012: National Central Human Body Resource Bank was founded under KNIH of KCDC
 September 12, 2020: restructured into an expanded Korea Disease Control and Prevention Agency (KDCA) under the Ministry with more autonomy and resources
Source:

Its history is in line with the major infectious disease outbreaks in South Korea. After the SARS outbreak in 2003, the then-National Institute of Health was restructured to the American CDC-like KCDC. After the MERS outbreak in 2015, the head of KCDC was promoted to vice-ministerial level.

Given the 2020 general election where all major parties promised raising KCDC's autonomy by lifting its status to "administration/agency" and lessons learned from the COVID-19 outbreak, there have been rumors that there will be changes to the organisation in the near future. In his special public address to mark his third year in office on 10 May 2020, President Moon Jae-in announced that he will seek revision of legislation to raise the status of the KCDC to the administration.

On 12 September 2020, the KCDC expanded to an Korea Disease Control and Prevention Agency (KDCA) with more autonomy and resources - most notably 42% increase in its staff number and its Center for Infectious Disease Research of KNIH becoming a research institute of KNIH. Director of KCDC, Jeong Eun-kyeong, will continue lead the organisation as its first Commissioner.

Organization 
Source:

Commissioner of KDCA 
 Spokesperson
 Emergency Operations Center (EOC)
 Director General for Public Health Emergency Preparedness
 Director for Emergency Response Capacity Development
 Director for Risk Assessment
 Director for Epidemiological Investigation Analysis
 Director for Public Health Emergency Response Research

Vice Commissioner of KDCA
 Director for Audit and Inspection
 Director General for Planning and Coordination
 Director for Planning and Finance
 Director for Organizational and Legal Affairs
 Director for International Affairs
 Director for Information and Statistics
 Division of General Affairs
 Bureau of Infectious Disease Policy
 Division of Infectious Disease Policy Coordination
 Division of Infectious Disease Control
 Division of Zoonotic and Vector Borne Disease Control
 Division of Tuberculosis Prevention and Control
 Division of HIV/AIDS Prevention and Control
 Bureau of Infectious Disease Emergency Preparedness and Response
 Division of Emergency Response
 Division of Quarantine Policy
 Division of Healthcare Resopnse Facility Management
 Division of Medical Stockpile Management
 Division of Emerging Infectious Diseases
 Bureau of Infectious Disease Diagnosis Control
 Division of Laboratory Diagnosis Management
 Division of Bacterial Diseases
 Division of Viral Diseases
 Division of Vectors and Parasitic Diseases
 Division of High-Risk Pathogens
 Division of Emerging Infectious Diseases
 Bureau of Healthcare Safety and Immunization
 Division of Immunization
 Division of Healthcare Associated Infection Control
 Division of Anti.microbial Resistance Control
 Division of Vaccine Supply
 Division of Medical Radiation
 Division of Biosafety Evaluation and Control
 Bureau of Chronic Disease Prevention and Control
 Division of Chronic Disease Control
 Division of Chronic Disease Prevention
 Division of Rare Disease Management
 Division of Health and Nutrition Survey and Analysis
 Director General for Health Hazard Response
 Division of Health Hazard Response
 Division of Injury Prevention and Control
 Division of Climate Change and Health Protection

Child agencies 
 National Research Institute of Health/Korea National Institute of Health (KNIH)
 National Infectious Disease Research Institute
 Regional Centers for Disease Control and Prevention
 National Quarantine Station
 Incheon Airport Quarantine
 Gunsan Quarantine
 Ulsan Quarantine
 Busan Quarantine
 Mokpo Quarantine
 Gimhae Quarantine
 Incheon Quarantine
 Yeosu Quarantine
 Pohang Quarantine
 Masan Quarantine
 Tongyeong Quarantine
 Donghae Quarantine
 Jeju Quarantine
 Mokpo National Tuberculosis Hospital
 Masan National Tuberculosis Hospital

Leadership

Director of KCDC
 Kim Moon-sik (2003–2004)
 Oh Dae-gyu (2004–2007)
 Lee Jong-gu (2007–2011)
 Jeon Byeong-yul (2011–2013)
 Yang Byeong-guk (2013–2016)
 Jeong Gi-seok (2016–2017)
 Jeong Eun-kyeong (2017–2020)

Commissioner of KDCA
 Jeong Eun-kyeong (2020–2022)
 Peck Kyong-ran (2022–present)

Publications 
 Osong Public Health and Research Perspectives

See also 
 2009 swine flu pandemic
 2015 Middle East respiratory syndrome outbreak in South Korea
 COVID-19 pandemic in South Korea
 List of national public health agencies
 Centers for Disease Control and Prevention (CDC), USA
 Chinese Center for Disease Control and Prevention (CCDC), China

References 

Government agencies of South Korea
Government health agencies
Public health organizations
Cheongju
Biosafety level 4 laboratories
National public health agencies